Naftaly Parrales (born 18 November 1940) is a Nicaraguan weightlifter. He competed in the men's bantamweight event at the 1976 Summer Olympics.

References

1940 births
Living people
Nicaraguan male weightlifters
Olympic weightlifters of Nicaragua
Weightlifters at the 1976 Summer Olympics
Place of birth missing (living people)